The Salt Lake Formation is a geologic formation exposed principally in Northern Utah and Southeast Idaho, with other small exposures in Southwest Wyoming and Northeast Nevada. Dates generally range from mid-Miocene to early Pliocene, with most dates falling between 10 Ma to 4 Ma, but perhaps starting as early as 15 Ma and extending to as late as 2 Ma in places.  The primarily sedimentary record preserves lacustrine and alluvial fan environments, as well as a few tuffaceous expressions.  Preserved fossils include Blancan fauna.

See also

 List of fossiliferous stratigraphic units in Idaho
 Paleontology in Idaho

References
 

Neogene geology of Utah